The Art Site of Chiayi Railway Warehouse is a historical warehouse in West District, Chiayi City, Taiwan.

History
In 1999, the Taiwan Provincial Government chose Chiayi City as the place for the Art Network of Railway Warehouse due to its position as the art and culture capital. In July 2000, the Council of Cultural Affairs chose five candidates and then decided to make the warehouse. The warehouse was converted from an idle railway warehouse. The planning work started in September 2000 by Chiayi City Government aiming to turn the warehouse into a center of art creation and exhibition.

Architecture
A total of 12 warehouses are lined up from north to south direction to form a block. The warehouses provide a total area of 2,500 m2 of interior space for creative work, exhibition, performance and education. The outdoor area is divided into outdoor performance area, creative art area and general area.

Events
 Black Golden Section Art Festival

Transportation
The building is accessible within walking distance north of Chiayi Station of Taiwan Railways.

See also
 List of tourist attractions in Taiwan
 Chiayi Station

References

External links

  

Art centers in Chiayi
Warehouses in Taiwan
West District